is a Japanese manga written and illustrated by Yugi Yamada. It is licensed in North America by Digital Manga Publishing, which released the manga's two bound volumes through its imprint, Juné, between March 25 and June 24, 2008.  Houbunsha releases the manga three tankōbon volumes between June 2000 and October 2000.

Reception
Anime News Network's Casey Brienza commends the manga for its "interesting (and sexy!) characters, a complex, well-conceived plot, and plenty of laughs to lighten up the angsty bits" but criticizes it for "a weak bonus story in volume two and artwork that remains a bit amateurish". Coolstreak Comics' Leroy Douresseaux commends the manga artist as a "master of complex, passionate psychological dramas". Mania.com's Briana Lawrence comments on the movie aspect of the manga "serving as a tool to highlight the more important things in the manga: Jun and Yutaka's relationship, Toshi and Nakamura's developing relationship, the birth of Miki's baby, and we get to see all the major plot points through the eyes of a camera". Active Anime's Rachel Bentham comments that the manga is "more soap opera antics behind the scenes of this film club".

References

Further reading

External links

2000 manga
Comedy-drama anime and manga
Digital Manga Publishing titles
Houbunsha manga
Josei manga
Yaoi anime and manga